The Autism Society of America (ASA) was founded in 1965 by Bernard Rimland and Ivar Lovaas together with Ruth C. Sullivan and a small group of other parents of children with autism. Its original name was the National Society for Autistic Children; the name was changed to emphasize that autistic children grow up. The ASA's stated goal is to increase public awareness about autism and the day-to-day issues faced by autistic people as well as their families and the professionals with whom they interact. Although the group has promoted the pseudoscientific belief that vaccines cause autism in the past, it now affirms that there is no link between vaccination and autism. In 2021, the ASA launched a new brand including a logo consisting of multicolor lines forming a fabric with a new slogan, "The Connection Is You".

Founders

Ivar Løvaas

Ole Ivar Løvaas (8 May 1927 – 2 August 2010) was a Norwegian-American clinical psychologist and professor at the University of California, Los Angeles. He is most well-known for his research on what was then called behavior modification to teach autistic children through prompts, modeling, and positive reinforcement. His method also had a history of using aversives to reduce undesired behaviors.

Lovaas founded the Lovaas Institute and co-founded the Autism Society of America. He has also been considered a pioneer of what is now called applied behavior analysis due to his development of discrete trial training and early intensive behavioral intervention for autistic children. 

His work influenced how autism is treated, and Lovaas received widespread acclaim and several awards for his work during his lifetime.

Bernard Rimland

Bernard Rimland (November 15, 1928 – November 21, 2006) was an American research psychologist, writer, lecturer, and influential person in the field of developmental disorders who is known for promoting autism-related pseudoscience. In 1964, Dr. Bernard Rimland wrote a book, Infantile Autism, that convinced others working in the field that autism is a physiological disorder, not a mental or emotional problem. Rimland was a founder of the Autism Society of America in 1965, but left to create the Autism Research Institute in 1967. He later promoted several theories, which have since been disproven, about the causes and treatment of autism, including vaccine denial, facilitated communication, chelation therapy, and false claims of a link between secretin and autism.

Ruth C. Sullivan

Ruth C. Sullivan was the first elected president of the Autism Society of America. She is also on the permanent honorary board of the society. Ruth Sullivan was founder and former Executive Director of the Autism Services Center, a nonprofit licensed behavioral health care agency that she founded in Huntington, West Virginia in 1979. It now provides services in four counties to families who have a family member with developmental disabilities.  She retired from the Autism Services Center on November 1, 2007 at the age of 83. Sullivan assisted in the production of the 1988 movie, Rain Man, by serving as a consultant on autistic behavior, and Dustin Hoffman worked with Sullivan and her son Joseph, who is autistic, when practising for his role.

References

External links
 Autism Society of America: home page

Autism-related organizations in the United States
Mental health organizations in Maryland
Organizations established in 1965
1965 establishments in the United States